Tomko is a surname. Notable people with the surname include:

 Travis Tomko (born 1976), aka Tomko, American professional wrestler
 Al Tomko (1931–2009), Canadian professional wrestler and wrestling promoter
 Dewey Tomko (born 1946), American professional poker player
 Brett Tomko (born 1973), Major League Baseball pitcher with the Kansas City Royals
 Jozef Tomko (1924–2022), Slovak cardinal in the Roman Catholic Church

Slovak-language surnames